Lochmaeocles sladeni is a species of beetle in the family Cerambycidae. It was described by Charles Joseph Gahan in 1903. It is known from Paraguay, Argentina, Brazil and Uruguay.

References

sladeni
Beetles described in 1903